SEK (Sidirodromoi Ellinikou Kratous, Hellenic State Railways) Class Λγ (or Class Lg; Lambda-gamma) is a class of eight 2-10-0 steam locomotives purchased in 1947 from Baldwin Locomotive Works.

They were given the class letters "Λγ" and numbered 991 to 998.

References

 http://balkanmodels.biz/forum/viewtopic.php?f=16&t=174 

Baldwin locomotives
Λγ
2-10-0 locomotives
Steam locomotives of Greece
Railway locomotives introduced in 1947
Standard gauge locomotives of Greece